Positive-real functions, often abbreviated to PR function or PRF, are a kind of mathematical function that first arose in electrical network synthesis. They are complex functions, Z(s), of a complex variable, s.  A rational function is defined to have the PR property if it has a positive real part and is analytic in the right half of the complex plane and takes on real values on the real axis.

In symbols the definition is,

In electrical network analysis, Z(s) represents an impedance expression and s is the complex frequency variable, often expressed as its real and imaginary parts;

in which terms the PR condition can be stated;

The importance to network analysis of the PR condition lies in the realisability condition. Z(s) is realisable as a one-port rational impedance if and only if it meets the PR condition.  Realisable in this sense means that the impedance can be constructed from a finite (hence rational) number of discrete ideal passive linear elements (resistors, inductors and capacitors in electrical terminology).

Definition
The term positive-real function was originally defined by Otto Brune to describe any function Z(s) which
is rational (the quotient of two polynomials),
is real when s is real
has positive real part when s has a positive real part
Many authors strictly adhere to this definition by explicitly requiring rationality,  or by restricting attention to rational functions, at least in the first instance. However, a similar more general condition, not restricted to rational functions had earlier been considered by Cauer, and some authors ascribe the term positive-real to this type of condition, while others consider it to be a generalization of the basic definition.

History
The condition was first proposed by Wilhelm Cauer (1926) who determined that it was a necessary condition.  Otto Brune (1931) coined the term positive-real for the condition and proved that it was both necessary and sufficient for realisability.

Properties
The sum of two PR functions is PR.
The composition of two PR functions is PR. In particular, if Z(s) is PR, then so are 1/Z(s) and Z(1/s).
All the zeros and poles of a PR function are in the left half plane or on its boundary of the imaginary axis.
Any poles and zeroes on the imaginary axis are simple (have a multiplicity of one).
Any poles on the imaginary axis have real strictly positive residues, and similarly at any zeroes on the imaginary axis, the function has a real strictly positive derivative.
Over the right half plane, the minimum value of the real part of a PR function occurs on the imaginary axis (because the real part of an analytic function constitutes a harmonic function over the plane, and therefore satisfies the maximum principle).
For a rational PR function, the number of poles and number of zeroes differ by at most one.

Generalizations
A couple of generalizations are sometimes made, with intention of characterizing the immittance functions of a wider class of passive linear electrical networks.

Irrational functions
The impedance Z(s) of a network consisting of an infinite number of components (such as a semi-infinite ladder), need not be a rational function of s, and in particular may have branch points in the left half s-plane. To accommodate such functions in the definition of PR, it is therefore necessary to relax the condition that the function be real for all real s, and only require this when s is positive. Thus, a possibly irrational function Z(s) is PR if and only if
Z(s) is analytic in the open right half s-plane (Re[s] > 0)
Z(s) is real when s is positive and real
Re[Z(s)] ≥ 0 when Re[s] ≥ 0
Some authors start from this more general definition, and then particularize it to the rational case.

Matrix-valued functions
Linear electrical networks with more than one port may be described by impedance or admittance matrices. So by extending the definition of PR to matrix-valued functions, linear multi-port networks which are passive may be distinguished from those that are not. A possibly irrational matrix-valued function Z(s) is PR if and only if
Each element of Z(s) is analytic in the open right half s-plane (Re[s] > 0)
Each element of Z(s) is real when s is positive and real
The Hermitian part (Z(s) + Z†(s))/2 of Z(s) is positive semi-definite when Re[s] ≥ 0

References

 Wilhelm Cauer (1932) The Poisson Integral for Functions with Positive Real Part, Bulletin of the American Mathematical Society 38:713–7, link from Project Euclid.
 W. Cauer (1932) "Über Funktionen mit positivem Realteil", Mathematische Annalen 106: 369–94.
Complex analysis
Electronic engineering
Types of functions